Hugo Lowell (born March 30, 1999) is a British-American political investigations reporter for The Guardian. He has broken a number of high-profile stories on the January 6 select committee investigation and regularly appears as a political analyst on MSNBC.

Early life and education 
Lowell was born in New York City. He was educated at the Dalton School and St. Paul's School, London.

Career 
Lowell was named a political investigations reporter for Guardian US in November 2022, assigned to cover former President Donald Trump and the Department of Justice.

He previously reported on the House January 6 select committee investigation as a congressional reporter for the newspaper. He has broken a number high-profile stories about the congressional inquiry, including that from the White House, Trump called political operatives at a "war room" the night before the January 6 attack on the US Capitol and discussed ways to obstruct the congressional certification of Joe Biden's election win.

The Trump war room scoop, which led to the House January 6 committee to open a new line of inquiry and issue at least one subpoena to a crucial Trump advisor, won the 2022 National Press Club's Sandy Hume Memorial Award for Excellence in Political Journalism.

Lowell was also first to report that Trump used a White House phone on January 6 not reflected in the official call log, that Trump's former White House chief of staff turned over to investigators a presentation recommending Trump declare a national security emergency to return himself to office, and that Trump would instruct top aides to defy congressional subpoenas, considered a potential obstruction of justice.

He regularly appears as a political analyst on MSNBC, including as a guest on Morning Joe, The Beat with Ari Melber, and The ReidOut, as well as on NBC's streaming service Peacock. He has also appeared on the PBS NewsHour, CBS News, BBC World News, BBC World Service radio and Sirius XM radio. Hayes has described his reporting as "groundbreaking" and Mehdi Hasan has called him a "scoop machine". His reporting has been cited in The New York Times, The Washington Post and Bloomberg.

Before covering Congress, Lowell reported on the Russian doping scandal and the International Olympic Committee for the i newspaper. He also reported from the 2018 FIFA World Cup and the 2017 World Athletics Championships, for which he was named a finalist at the British Sports Journalism Awards.

He is based in Washington, DC.

References

External links 
 Hugo Lowell on Twitter
Hugo Lowell on IMDb
Hugo Lowell on C-SPAN

1999 births
Living people
American male journalists
Political journalists
American political journalists
People educated at St Paul's School, London
British newspaper journalists
The Guardian journalists
American newspaper journalists
21st-century American male writers
People from New York City